Ellesmere College is a school in Shropshire, England.

Ellesmere may also refer to:

 Ellesmere College, Leeston, New Zealand
 Ellesmere College, Leicester, England